Mark Blum (May 14, 1950 – March 25, 2020) was an American actor who worked in theater, film, and television. He found success with a lead role in the 1985 film Desperately Seeking Susan, which he followed up the next year with a supporting role in Crocodile Dundee. On the stage, Blum won an Obie Award for his role in the play Gus and Al during its 1988–1989 season.

Near the end of his career, Blum had a regularly recurring role on the Amazon Prime series Mozart in the Jungle from 2014 to 2018. He also made guest appearances on dozens of shows throughout his career.

Early life
Blum was born in Newark, New Jersey, to Lorraine and Morton Blum, who worked in the insurance industry. His family was Jewish. He grew up in Maplewood, New Jersey, and graduated from Columbia High School in 1968 and was inducted into the school's hall of fame in 2012. He then went on to graduate from the University of Pennsylvania.

Career
Blum started acting on stage in the 1970s. In the 1980s, he acted in the movies Lovesick (1983), Desperately Seeking Susan (1985), Just Between Friends (1986), Crocodile Dundee (1986), Blind Date (1987), and The Presidio (1988). He later appeared in Coin Heist (2017).

On television, he co-starred in Sweet Surrender in 1987. He also appeared on the following programs: Capital News in 1990, Frasier in 1997, and NYPD Blue in 1999. From 2014 to 2018, he appeared in Mozart in the Jungle.

Blum won an Obie Award for his performance as Al in the Playwrights Horizons production of Albert Innaurato's play, Gus and Al, during the 1988–1989 season. On Broadway, he appeared in Neil Simon's Lost in Yonkers, Gore Vidal's The Best Man, and Richard Greenberg's The Assembled Parties. In 2013, he appeared as Max in the Primary Stages production of The Model Apartment. Blum was on the faculty of HB Studio in New York City.

In 2018, Blum was cast in a recurring role as Ivan Mooney in the former Lifetime thriller series You. He  regularly acted at Playwrights Horizons, an off-Broadway theater in New York City. Blum frequently appeared on Broadway, including in the revival of Twelve Angry Men. His recent Broadway credits included The Assembled Parties, Gore Vidal's The Best Man—twice—and Neil Simon's Lost in Yonkers.

Blum was active in the Screen Actors Guild, having served on the New York and national boards.

Personal life and death
Blum was married to actress Janet Zarish, who appeared on television as Natalie Bannon on As the World Turns and as Lee Halpern on One Life to Live.

Blum died from complications associated with COVID-19 at New York–Presbyterian Hospital on March 25, 2020, aged 69, during the COVID-19 pandemic in New York City. The season 3 premieres of You and Succession were dedicated in Blum's memory.

Filmography

Film

Television

Video games

See also

References

External links
  
 
 
 Mark Blum at the Internet Theatre Database

1950 births
2020 deaths
20th-century American male actors
21st-century American male actors
American male film actors
American male stage actors
American male television actors
Columbia High School (New Jersey) alumni
Deaths from the COVID-19 pandemic in New York (state)
Jewish American male actors
Male actors from Newark, New Jersey
People from Maplewood, New Jersey
University of Pennsylvania alumni